The 53rd Annual Tony Awards was broadcast by CBS from the Gershwin Theatre on June 6, 1999.  "The First Ten" awards ceremony was telecast on PBS television. The show did not have a formal host.

The ceremony
The opening number was "There's No Business Like Show Business", sung by Bernadette Peters and Tom Wopat.

Host Chris Rock 

 Julie Andrews
 Bea Arthur
 Alec Baldwin
 Christine Baranski
 Matthew Broderick
 Carol Burnett
 Zoe Caldwell
 Mario Cantone
 Stockard Channing
 Alan Cumming
 Judi Dench
 Brian Dennehy
 Laurence Fishburne
 Calista Flockhart

 David Hare
 William Hurt
 Swoosie Kurtz
 Angela Lansbury
 Audra McDonald
 Terrence McNally
 Sarah Jessica Parker
 David Hyde Pierce
 Chita Rivera
 Jason Robards
 Christian Slater
 Kevin Spacey
 Scott Wolf

The musicals represented were:
 The Civil War ("Freedom's Child" - Lawrence Clayton and Company)
 Peter Pan ("I'm Flying" - Cathy Rigby and children)
 Parade ("This Is Not Over Yet"/"The Old Red Hills of Home" - Carolee Carmello, Brent Carver and Company)
 You're a Good Man, Charlie Brown ("My New Philosophy"/"Happiness" - Kristin Chenoweth, Anthony Rapp and Company)
 Fosse ("Sing Sing Sing" - Company)
 Little Me ("Boom Boom" - Martin Short and Company)
 Annie Get Your Gun ("I Got the Sun in the Morning"/"Hoedown"/"Old-Fashioned Wedding" - Tom Wopat, Bernadette Peters and Company)

The telecast included a special presentation (a "collage of moments") featuring performers from several of the productions nominated as Best Play and Best Revival of a Play.

Winners and nominees

Winners are in bold

Special awards
The following non-completive awards were presented:

Regional Theater Tony Award
Crossroads Theatre (New Brunswick, New Jersey)
Special Lifetime Achievement Tony Award
Arthur Miller
Special Lifetime Achievement Tony Award
Isabelle Stevenson
Special Lifetime Achievement Tony Award
Uta Hagen
Special Tony Award For a Live Theatrical Presentation
Fool Moon (Bill Irwin and David Shiner)

Multiple nominations and awards

These productions had multiple nominations:

9 nominations: Parade 
8 nominations: Fosse
6 nominations: Death of a Salesman and Not About Nightingales 
5 nominations: The Iceman Cometh, Swan Lake and Twelfth Night 
4 nominations: Footloose, It Ain't Nothin' But the Blues, Little Me, The Lonesome West and You're a Good Man, Charlie Brown
3 nominations: Annie Get Your Gun and Electra  
2 nominations: Amy's View, The Civil War, Marlene, Ring Round the Moon and Side Man    

The following productions received multiple awards.

4 wins: Death of a Salesman
3 wins: Fosse and Swan Lake
2 wins: Annie Get Your Gun, Parade, Side Man and You're a Good Man, Charlie Brown

See also
 Drama Desk Awards
 1999 Laurence Olivier Awards – equivalent awards for West End theatre productions
 Obie Award
 New York Drama Critics' Circle
 Theatre World Award
 Lucille Lortel Awards

References

External links
 Tony Awards official site

Tony Awards ceremonies
1999 in theatre
1999 theatre awards
Tony
1999 in New York City